Eurytides bellerophon is a butterfly of the family Papilionidae. It is found in south-eastern Brazil (Minas Gerais, São Paulo and from Santa Catarina to Mato Grosso), Bolivia (Pando and Mapiri) and northern Argentina (Misiones).

The larvae feed on Guatteria nigrescens.

References

Eurytides
Papilionidae of South America
Lepidoptera of Brazil
Arthropods of Argentina
Invertebrates of Bolivia
Fauna of the Andes
Butterflies described in 1823